Al-Osra Sport Club, is an Iraqi football team based in Karbala, that plays in the Iraq Division Two.

Managerial history
 Alaa Karim

See also
 2022–23 Iraq FA Cup

References

External links
 Al-Osra SC on Goalzz.com
 Iraq Clubs- Foundation Dates

Association football clubs established in 2020
Football clubs in Karbala